The 2WD class of the 2015 IFMAR 1:10 Electric Off-Road World Championship
commencing on the 4 October and concluding on the 6 October at the Yatabe Arena in Tsukuba in the Ibaraki Prefecture, Japan .

Qualifying

Race

A-main

B-main

C-main

D-main

E-main

F-main

G-main

H-main

I-main

J-main

K-main

L-main

M-main

N-main

References

External links 
 Official page
 
 

IFMAR 1:10 Electric Off-Road World Championship - 2WD
IFMAR 1:10 Electric Off-Road World Championship